Erattayar Dam (Malayalam: ഇരട്ടയാർ അണക്കെട്ട്) is a small diversion dam built on the Erattayar river in Erattayar Grama Panchayat near Kattappana town in Idukki district of Kerala, India. It acts mainly as a diversion dam to supply water to the Idukki Dam.  Diversion of water from Erattayar forebay to Idukki reservoir is through a tunnel called Anchuruli tunnel which is 3771.9m long. Construction of the dam was completed in the year 1989.

It is a small dam measuring only 46.3 m in length and 19.81 m in height. Idukki HE Project- Stage III- Kallar-Erattayar diversion scheme envisages creation of two forebays by means of diversion dams, one in river Kallar of storage capacity 28 Mcft.( 0.793 MCM) and another in river Erattayar of storage capacity 189 Mcft (5.352 MCM) in the upper reaches of river Perinjamkutty a tributary of Periyar. Water from Kallar is diverted to Erattayar through a tunnel 2735.58 m long.  Taluk through which release flows are Thodupuzha, Udumpanchola, Devikulam, Kothamangalam, Muvattupuzha, Kunnathunadu, Aluva, Kodungalloor and Paravur.

Details of the dam

Latitude : 9⁰ 48′ 35 ” N
Longitude: 77⁰ 06′ 20” E
Panchayath :Erattayar
Village: Erattayar
District : Idukki
River : Perinjamkutty ( Tributory of Periyar)
Release from Dam to river : Erattayar
Year of completion : 1975
Type of Dam : Concrete- Gravity
Classification : MH ( Medium Height)
Maximum Water Level (MWL) : EL 754.38 m
Full Reservoir Level ( FRL) : EL 754.38 m
Storage at FRL :5.352 Mm3
Height from deepest foundation : 19.81 m
Length : 146.3 m 
Spillway : Ogee type – 2 Nos. Radial gates, each of size 7.62 x 6.10 m
Name of Project : Idukki HEP
River Outlet : 1 No. vertical lift type, 2.44 x 1.83 m
Purpose of Project : Hydro Power

References

Dams in Kerala